Aboul Bashar Khan (born March 1, 1960) is an American politician of Bangladeshi descent. He is currently serving as a member of the New Hampshire House of Representatives, representing Rockingham District 20 (Hampton Falls and Seabrook) since 2016. He previously represented the same district from 2012 to 2014.

Early life and education 
Khan was born on March 1, 1960, in Bhandaria upazila of Pirojpur district. He is the eldest of the two sons and two daughters of former defense secretary Mahabub Uddin Khan Kanchan and his wife Shahanara Begum.

Khan passed the matriculation examination from the Muslim Government High School, Dhaka, in 1976. After completing his higher secondary education from Notre Dame College in 1978, he was admitted to the Department of Political Science at the University of Dhaka. After studying there for three years, he moved to the United States on a student visa on January 10, 1981, and settled there.

Electoral history

References

External links 
 Khan at ourcampaigns.com

Living people
1960 births
People from Pirojpur District
People from Seabrook, New Hampshire
Republican Party members of the New Hampshire House of Representatives
21st-century American politicians
American people of Bangladeshi descent
Notre Dame College, Dhaka alumni
Asian-American people in New Hampshire politics
Asian conservatism in the United States